Jennifer White Shah, also known as Jenny White, is a British actress.

She played Julia Livilla in The Caesars and also appeared in the original Casino Royale film and in Carry on Doctor.

She is married to Eddy Shah.

References

External links 

British television actresses
Living people
Year of birth missing (living people)
Place of birth missing (living people)